Robinsonia mossi is a moth in the family Erebidae. It was described by Walter Rothschild in 1922. It is found in French Guiana and Brazil.

References

Moths described in 1922
Robinsonia (moth)